Cheval noir (french: cheval = horse, noir = black) can refer to:
Horses with a black coat.
A legend from Quebec (See French Wikipedia: Cheval noir)
Cheval Noir (mountain), a mountain in the French Alps
Cheval Noir unit, a geologic unit in the French Alps
Cheval Noir (comics), a comics anthology